Hassan Ayariga (born 4 September 1972) is a Ghanaian accountant, entrepreneur and politician. He is the founder of the All People's Congress (APC) and was the candidate of the People's National Convention for the December 2012 presidential election.

Early life and education
Ayariga spent his childhood in Accra and Bawku, moving to Nigeria with his parents after the overthrow of the Limann administration. He attended Ghana Secondary School in Tamale and then in Nigeria Barewa College in Zaria. He later studied accounting at the London School of Accountancy and earned a PhD from Atlantic International University, an American distance learning university.

Politics 
In the presidential primaries of the People's National Convention (PNC) for the 2016 general election, Ayariga lost to Edward Mahama, whom he had beaten to become presidential candidate in 2012. Citing anomalies and cheating, he left the party to form a new party, the All People’s Congress (APC), in 2016. The Electoral Commission of Ghana handed the party a provisional certificate after he met the requisite requirements, and it has since been granted a final certificate.

Personal life
His father, Frank Abdulai Ayariga, was a member of parliament for the Bawku Constituency during the third republic administration of Hilla Limann and his mother, Anatu Ayariga, a business woman.

His younger brother Mahama Ayariga is Minister for Youth and Sports (2015) as well as Member of Parliament for Bawku Central Constituency on the ticket of the National Democratic Congress. 

Hassan Ayariga lived and worked in Germany for many years and has business interests in both Ghana and Germany. He is married with a children and one in Germany.

References

External links 
 

1971 births
Living people
People's National Convention (Ghana) politicians
People from Upper East Region
Candidates for President of Ghana
All People's Congress (Ghana) politicians
Ghana Senior High School (Tamale) alumni